Bohdan Mykolayovych Orynchak (born 10 September 1993) is a Ukrainian professional footballer who plays as a right winger for Ukrainian club Prykarpattia Ivano-Frankivsk.

Career
Orynchak is a product of the Ivano-Frankivsk city Youth Sportive School System.

He made his professional debut for FC Prykarpattia in the away game against FC Arsenal-Kyivshchyna Bila Tserkva on 24 July 2016 in the Ukrainian Second League scoring a goal to make the score 3–0. The game would eventually end 6–0 thrashing.

On 27 November 2018 Orynchak was recognized as the best player in November 2018 by PFL.

References

External links
 
 
 

1993 births
Living people
Ukrainian footballers
Association football forwards
FC Prykarpattia Ivano-Frankivsk (1998) players
FC Rukh Lviv players
FC Mynai players
FC Volyn Lutsk players
FC Polissya Zhytomyr players
Ukrainian Premier League players
Ukrainian First League players
Ukrainian Second League players
Ukrainian Amateur Football Championship players
Sportspeople from Ivano-Frankivsk Oblast